Jean-Pierre Mango (6 February 1950 – June 2008) was a Senegalese sprinter. He competed in the men's 4 × 400 metres relay at the 1972 Summer Olympics.

References

1950 births
2008 deaths
Athletes (track and field) at the 1972 Summer Olympics
Senegalese male sprinters
Olympic athletes of Senegal
Place of birth missing